Krzysztof Bukalski is a retired Polish footballer playing lately for Górnik Zabrze. He was born 22 September 1970 in Kraków, Poland. He is a central midfielder.

Krzysztof Bukalski is a former Polish national player.

Clubs 
trainee - Wanda Nowa Huta
1986-1996   - Hutnik Kraków
1996-1997   - KRC Genk
1998-2000   - Wisła Kraków
2000-2001   - GKS Katowice
2001-2002   - Wisła Kraków
2002        - U.S. Fiorenzuola 1922
2002-2003   - Nea Salamis FC
2003-2007     - Górnik Zabrze

Achievements 
1998-99 - Polish champion with Wisła Kraków

Trivia 
 His debut for the Poland national football team took place on March 15, 1995 in Ostrowiec Świętokrzyski against Lithuania (4:1 for Poland).
 He has played 17 times for Poland, scoring 2 goals.

References

1970 births
Association football midfielders
Polish footballers
Poland international footballers
Ekstraklasa players
Belgian Pro League players
Cypriot First Division players
Górnik Zabrze players
Wisła Kraków players
GKS Katowice players
K.R.C. Genk players
Nea Salamis Famagusta FC players
Hutnik Nowa Huta players
Polish expatriate footballers
Expatriate footballers in Belgium
Expatriate footballers in Italy
Expatriate footballers in Cyprus
Living people
Footballers from Kraków